The New Chinese Empire is a book by Ross Terrill, published by Basic Books in 2003. The book won the Los Angeles Times Book Prize for Current Interest.

The book goes into in-depth explanations about the new and powerful Chinese "empire" and how it affects American society and ideology.  It also delves deeply into the psyche of the Chinese government's internal workings and explains China's view on domestic and foreign policies.

References 

China–United States relations
Political books
Books about China
Basic Books books